The BNXT League Sixth Man of the Year award is given annually at the end of the regular season of the BNXT League, the highest professional basketball league in Belgium and the Netherlands, to the player who performs best for his team as a substitute (or sixth man). To be eligible for this award, the player must come off the bench in more games than he started in the starting five.

The current award, given by the BNXT League, began when that league started, with the 2021–22 season.

BNXT League Sixth Man of the Year winners (2022–present)

Player nationalities by national team:

References

External links
BNXT League - Official Site
BNXT League - Official Award Page
BNXT League at Eurobasket.com

European basketball awards
BNXT League basketball awards